Brent Steven Scott (born June 15, 1971) is an American former professional basketball player, formerly in the NBA. Scott was a 6'10", . center.  Scott is currently an assistant coach at Virginia Commonwealth University.

College career
Scott played college basketball at Rice University.

Professional career
Scott played 16 games with the Indiana Pacers during the 1996–97 NBA season, averaging 1.2 points and 0.6 rebounds per game. He also played professionally in Poland (Anwil Wloclawek), Spain (for Tau Cerámica, Real Madrid Baloncesto, Polaris World Murcia), Italy (for Olitalia Forlì, Viola Reggio Calabria and Snaidero Udine) and Greece (Gymnastikos S. Larissas, PAOK and AEK Athens).

Coaching career
On June 25, 2007, Rice University announced that Scott would be an assistant basketball coach. He has since served in the same capacity at Louisiana State University and TCU, both under head coach Trent Johnson. On May 16, 2016, Scott returned to his alma mater Rice, after four years at TCU, to serve on Mike Rhoades staff.  In March 2017, he joined Rhoades' staff at VCU.

References

External links
TCU coaching biography
NBA statistics @ basketballreference.com
AEK player profile @ aek.com
Interview with Brent Scott, by Marek Mosakowski @ 24sec.net

1971 births
Living people
AEK B.C. players
African-American basketball players
American expatriate basketball people in Greece
American expatriate basketball people in Italy
American expatriate basketball people in Poland
American expatriate basketball people in Spain
American men's basketball players
Basketball coaches from Michigan
Basketball players from Michigan
CB Murcia players
Centers (basketball)
Gymnastikos S. Larissas B.C. players
Indiana Pacers players
Joventut Badalona players
KK Włocławek players
Liga ACB players
LSU Tigers basketball coaches
Pallalcesto Amatori Udine players
P.A.O.K. BC players
Real Madrid Baloncesto players
Rice Owls men's basketball coaches
Rice Owls men's basketball players
Saski Baskonia players
Sportspeople from Jackson, Michigan
TCU Horned Frogs men's basketball coaches
Undrafted National Basketball Association players
VCU Rams men's basketball coaches
Viola Reggio Calabria players
United States Basketball League players
21st-century African-American sportspeople
20th-century African-American sportspeople